Gregory C. Marshall Naval Architect Ltd. (GCMNA) of Victoria, British Columbia, Canada, is a designer of international luxury yachts. The company was established in 1994 by Gregory C. Marshall and with partner Gordon Galbraith, who joined the company in 1998, currently employs a design team of 18 employees.

GCMNA has been involved with more than 400 vessels in designs including styling, engineering, mechanical, electrical, interior design and decorating. In collaboration with many well known shipyards, including Burger Boat Company, Christensen Shipyards, Ocean Alexander, and Westport Shipyards. In 2012, the magazine Superyacht World voted the GCMNA-designed yacht Big Fish "one of the top 50 yachts of all time".

Big Fish 

Big Fish is an expedition (explorer yacht) type steel displacement luxury motor yacht constructed by McMullen and Wing of Auckland, New Zealand. Originally built for Hong-Kong businessman Richard Beattie to explore remote parts of the world, it is capable of being away for long periods of time. It has 5 guest cabins with accommodation for 10.

Awards 
 Top 50 finest yachts ever built –Superyacht World 2013
 International Superyacht – Society Awards 2011
 Showboats International Awards 2011
 World Yachts Trophy 2010
 Asian Boat Awards 2011

References

External links 
 Gregory C. Marshall Naval Architect Ltd.

Canadian yacht designers
Companies based in Victoria, British Columbia
Canadian companies established in 1994
Design companies established in 1994
1994 establishments in British Columbia